Albin Sporrong (born 6 December 1999) is a Swedish football midfielder who plays for Mjøndalen IF.

References

1999 births
Living people
Swedish footballers
Västerås SK Fotboll players
Västerås IK Fotboll players
Nyköpings BIS players
IFK Eskilstuna players
Mjøndalen IF players
Swedish expatriate footballers
Expatriate footballers in Norway
Swedish expatriate sportspeople in Norway
Ettan Fotboll players
Superettan players
Eliteserien players
Association football midfielders